Live in Sweden 1983 is a live album, released almost 20 years after it was recorded, of Phil Lynott's solo band after the breakup of the band Thin Lizzy. It was recorded from the soundboard and was released by Mark Stanway.

Track listing
All songs written by Phil Lynott except where noted.

Disc One
"Yellow Pearl" – (4:38)
"Old Town" (Jimmy Bain, Lynott) – (4:19)
"Sarah" (Lynott, Gary Moore) – (3:32)
"A Night in the Life of a Blues Singer" – (6:52)
"Look in These Eyes" – (7:31)
"Parisienne Walkways" (Lynott, Moore) – (6:20)
"Solo in Soho" – (5:56)
"King's Call" – (5:31)
"Baby Drives Me Crazy" (Brian Downey, Scott Gorham, Lynott, Brian Robertson) – (7:30)
"The Boys Are Back in Town" – (5:52)
"Still in Love with You" – (9:45)

Disc Two
"Yellow Pearl" – (3:54)
"Old Town" – (4:12)
"Sarah" (Lynott, Moore) – (3:58)
"A Night in the Life of a Blues Singer" – (6:25)
"Look in These Eyes" – (5:04)
"Parisienne Walkways" (Lynott, Moore) – (5:45)
"Solo in Soho" – (1:56)
"Baby Drives Me Crazy" (Downey, Gorham, Lynott, Robertson) – (10:02)

During "Solo in Soho", Lynott sings the refrain from "The Message" by Grandmaster Flash and The Furious Five and "The Boys Are Back in Town" is introduced by singing part of "Every Breath You Take" by The Police. "Kings Call" also includes the spoken refrain from Elvis Presley's "Are You Lonesome Tonight?". These tracks are not credited.

Personnel
Phil Lynott – bass guitar, lead vocals
John Sykes – guitar, backing vocals
Brian Downey – drums
Mark Stanway – keyboards
Donal "Doish" Nagle – guitar

Live albums published posthumously
2001 live albums
Phil Lynott albums